John Brierley (8 September 1904 – 1986) was an English footballer who played as an inside forward for Rochdale. He was also in the reserve teams of Manchester United and Oldham Athletic and played non-league football for various other clubs.

References

Rochdale A.F.C. players
Manchester United F.C. players
Oldham Athletic A.F.C. players
Bacup Borough F.C. players
Witton Albion F.C. players
Footballers from Oldham
English footballers
1904 births
1986 deaths
Association footballers not categorized by position